Guillaume Perreault (born in 1985) is a Canadian writer, illustrator, and comic book author originally from Rimouski, Quebec.  He was awarded the Governor General's Award for French-language children's illustration for the novel Pet et Répète: La véritable histoire at the 2020 Governor General's Awards. He has also written and illustrated a children's comic series entitled The Postman from Space.

Works

Comics 

 Cumulus (Mécanique Générale, 2004)
 Le facteur de l'espace series (La Pastèque)

 Volume 1 (2016)
 Volume 2 : Les pilleurs à moteur (2019)
 Volume 3: La faim du monde (2022)

Children's Books 
 Pet et Répète: La véritable histoire (with Katia Canciani, Fonfon, 2019)

Awards 

 2020 : Governor General Award for French-language young people's literature – Illustrated Books for Pet et Répète: la véritable histoire
 2022 : Librairie du Québec prize in the Québec youth category for La soupe aux allumettes, with Patrice Michaud

References

External links 
 

21st-century Canadian writers
Canadian cartoonists
Canadian children's book illustrators
Canadian comics artists
Canadian comics creators
French Quebecers
Canadian writers in French
Governor General's Award-winning children's illustrators
Living people
Writers from Quebec
1985 births